Keith Ernest Darvill (born 28 May 1948) is a Labour politician in the United Kingdom.  He is a councillor in the London Borough of Havering.

Darvill started his working life in the Port of London Authority as a dock messenger and was active in the Transport and General Workers Union. He was educated Norlington School in the London Borough of Waltham Forest, in East London and at the Polytechnic of Central London school of Law after which he worked as a solicitor.

Darvill was elected as Labour Member of Parliament for Upminster at the 1997, taking it from the Conservatives, and was one of the few Labour MPs to lose their seat at the 2001 to the Conservatives, in the person of Angela Watkinson.
Darvill  stood once again in Upminster, Labour's sixth target, at the May 2005 general election, but failed to regain the seat.

Darvill elected to Havering Council following his defeat in 2002. He also stood for the London Assembly and was very narrowly re-elected for his Heaton ward in Havering in the 2006 local elections when Labour was almost wiped out in the borough. Following the 2010 local elections Labour increased its council group to 5 and Darvill was elected Labour Group leader on the Council. As a result of the 2022 Local Elections Darvill retained his role as leader of the Labour group and was appointed cabinet member for Climate Change as part of a coalition deal he helped to negotiate between the Labour Party and Havering Residents Association 

He lives in Upminster with his wife Julia, he has three children and seven grandchildren.

References

External links 
 

1948 births
Living people
Labour Party (UK) MPs for English constituencies
Councillors in the London Borough of Havering
UK MPs 1997–2001
Alumni of the University of Westminster